Subramaniam a/l Sooryapparad  (born 31 August 1985) is a Malaysian professional footballer who mainly plays as a centre-back but also may operate as right-back and defensive midfielder for Malaysia Super League club Petaling Jaya City.

Club career

Perak
Subramaniam began his football career in 2004 playing for Perak youth team.

UPB-MyTeam (loan)
In 2006 while still playing for Perak FA, Subramaniam was loaned out to Liga Premier club, UPB-MyTeam for two seasons. That time he played under coach Bojan Hodak. MyTeam finished the 2006–07 season as runners-up behind PDRM, and as a result were promoted to the Liga Super in 2007–08 season.

Return to Perak
He was recalled to Perak for their Piala Malaysia campaign, in which he excelled along the campaign. Ironically Perak coach Steve Darby was originally unaware that Subramaniam was actually a Perak player. As a result of these performances, Subramaniam was called up for various matches with the national team. He only made six appearances for Perak for the entire 2007 season. He was one of a handful of players who remained with Perak at the end of 2008 following the team's financial difficulties. Subramaniam was announced as Perak team captain for the 2009 season, replacing Ahmad Shahrul Azhar.

Kelantan
In 2010, Subramaniam joined east coast Malaysia based team, Kelantan. He played for the team from 2010 until 2014 after he left for southern club, Johor Darul Ta'zim at the end of the 2014 season. He helped Kelantan win the Malaysia Cup in 2010 and later clinch the 2011 Malaysia Super League season league title. During 2012 season, he was part of the treble winners when Kelantan won all three Malaysia Super League, FA Cup and Malaysia Cup.

Return to Kelantan
On 20 January 2017, Subramaniam signed with Kelantan for second stints. He returned to the team after 2 seasons playing for Klang valley based team, Selangor. He last played for Kelantan from 2010 until 2013 before moved to south Malaysia club, Johor Darul Ta'zim in 2014 season.

Injury
In 2012, Subramaniam has got knee ligament injury ACL (anterior cruciate ligament) after colliding with an ATM player, Hairuddin Omar in 2012 Malaysia Cup final. He had undergone surgery in Kuala Lumpur Sports Medicine Centre (KLSMC), Damansara and require at least six months recovery before can return to the field.

International career
Subramaniam has earned national caps at various age levels. He was part of the Malaysia Under-23 side that played in the Olympic qualifiers between February and June 2007. Upon his return from that assignment, Subramaniam was then called up for training with the senior team.

He has also captained the Under-23 side on several occasions.

He played at the 2007 Sea Games campaign, starting beside Aidil Zafuan at the heart of Malaysian defence during the final group game against Singapore, and had a terrible time trying to mark out Singaporean, Khairul Amri.

He made his senior debut against Indonesia on 6 June 2008. He also played for the Malaysia XI squad against Chelsea at Shah Alam Stadium on 29 July 2008. He was also included in the national squads that played in the 2008 Merdeka Tournament and 2008 Myanmar Grand Royal Challenge Cup.

In 2011, he was called up for the national team for a friendly match against Chelsea . He also captained but unfortunately the team lost by one goal.

After a three-year hiatus, he was recalled by the Malaysia national team for friendlies against Philippines in early 2012.

Career statistics

Club

Honours

Club
Johor Darul Ta'zim
 Malaysia Super League: 2014

Club
MyTeam
 Malaysia Premier League: Runner-up 2006–07

Kelantan
 Malaysia Super League: 2011, 2012; Runner-up 2010
 Malaysia Cup: 2010, 2012
 Malaysia FA Cup: 2012; Runner-up 2011
 Malaysia Charity Shield: 2011; Runner-up 2012, 2013
 Piala Emas Raja-Raja: 2010

Selangor
 Malaysia Cup: 2015 Runner-up 2016

Personal life
Subramaniam was born in the heart city of Sungai Siput town in Kuala Kangsar, Perak.

References

External links
 

1985 births
Living people
Malaysian footballers
Malaysia international footballers
Perak F.C. players
Kelantan FA players
Selangor FA players
UPB-MyTeam FC players
Petaling Jaya City FC players
People from Kuala Kangsar
People from Perak
Malaysian people of Tamil descent
Malaysian sportspeople of Indian descent
Footballers at the 2006 Asian Games
Association football defenders
Asian Games competitors for Malaysia